The 1976 United States Senate election in Minnesota took place on November 2, 1976. Incumbent Democratic U.S. Senator Hubert Humphrey won re-election to a fifth term. This is the last U.S. Senate election in which a candidate won all of Minnesota's 87 counties.

Democratic–Farmer–Labor primary

Candidates

Declared
 Dick Bullock
 Hubert H. Humphrey, Incumbent U.S. Senator since 1971, Democratic nominee for President in 1968, former Vice President of the United States (1965–1969), former U.S. Senator (1949–1964)

Results

Independent-Republican primary

Candidates

Declared
 Jerry Brekke, College professor
 Richard "Dick" Franson
 John H. Glover
 Bea Mooney
 Roland "Butch" Riemers

Results

General election

Results

See also 
 1976 United States Senate elections

References

Minnesota
1976
1976 Minnesota elections
Hubert Humphrey